Adrian John Liddell Hart (1922–1991) was a British soldier, Royal Navy officer, Liberal politician, author and adventurer. He served briefly in the French Foreign Legion and portrayed it in the 1953 book Strange Company.

Early life and career
The son of Sir Basil Liddell Hart (1895–1970), by his first wife Jessie Stone, Liddell Hart was the godson of Major-General J. F. C. Fuller, and was educated at St Andrew's School, Pangbourne, before Eton and King's College, Cambridge. With the outbreak of the Second World War in 1939 he joined the British Army and in 1940 became adjutant of the Local Defence Volunteers at Dartington, Devon.

In 1945, he was appointed flag lieutenant to the admiral commanding Iceland.

Later career
In 1945, he was the Liberal candidate for the Blackpool South constituency. From 1945 to 1946 Liddell Hart was assistant editor to the Preparatory Commission of the United Nations, and, from 1946 to 1947, was a political affairs officer of the United Nations Organisation, based in New York. 

He next joined the Control Service for Germany, attached to the British Army of the Rhine, and the administrative staff headquarters of the Allied Control Council (British sector). He worked for the original Outward Bound Sea School in 1949 and as the House of Commons lobby correspondent of The Yorkshire Observer from 1949 to 1950.

Under the name of Peter Brand, Liddell Hart served in the French Foreign Legion as an ordinary legionnaire from 1950 to 1951, then in the Legion's First Foreign Cavalry Regiment in French Indo China. In 1952 he took a job with the Outward Bound Trust at Aberdyfi, Gwynedd, and, from 1953 to 1954, worked in the Canadian oil industry. 

From 1955 to 1956, he was with the Canadian Broadcasting Corporation in Toronto, before joining the Federation of British Industry from 1959 to 1960, when he was appointed Assistant Director of the Society of British Aircraft Constructors. In 1962, he became an Analyst in London for Gordon Rayment and Co. Ltd., and in 1963 Assistant General Secretary of the United Nations Association International Service. 

He was a public relations executive for Informat from 1965 to 1966, then in 1968 joined St John's House, London, a hostel for homeless young offenders. In 1971 he was briefly Warden of the Elswick Lodge Rehabilitation Centre in Newcastle upon Tyne.

In later life he lived in Stroud, Gloucestershire, where he died in 1991.

Politics
At the 1945 general election, Liddell Hart was the Liberal candidate for Blackpool South, and at the 1950 general election was the party's candidate for Sowerby. On both occasions, he was defeated.

Works
Books
The Growth of New Germany (1949)
Strange Company (1953)
The Sword and the Pen: Selections From the World's Greatest Military Writings (1975)

References

1922 births
1991 deaths
People educated at Eton College
People educated at St Andrew's School, Pangbourne
Alumni of King's College, Cambridge
Royal Naval Volunteer Reserve personnel of World War II
Royal Navy officers
Soldiers of the French Foreign Legion
English autobiographers
English male journalists
Liberal Party (UK) parliamentary candidates
20th-century  English historians
20th-century English male writers